Dabrowno may refer to the following places in Poland:
Dąbrówno, Warmian-Masurian Voivodeship
Dąbrówno, Pomeranian Voivodeship
Dąbrowno, Lubusz Voivodeship
Dąbrowno, Silesian Voivodeship